Antifolates are a class of antimetabolite medications that antagonise (that is, block) the actions of folic acid (vitamin B9). Folic acid's primary function in the body is as a cofactor to various methyltransferases involved in serine, methionine, thymidine and purine biosynthesis. Consequently, antifolates inhibit cell division, DNA/RNA synthesis and repair and protein synthesis. Some such as proguanil, pyrimethamine and trimethoprim selectively inhibit folate's actions in microbial organisms such as bacteria, protozoa and fungi. The majority of antifolates work by inhibiting dihydrofolate reductase (DHFR).

Comparison of available agents

Mechanism
Many are primarily DHFR inhibitors, but raltitrexed is an inhibitor of thymidylate synthase, and pemetrexed inhibits both and a third enzyme.

Antifolates act specifically during DNA and RNA synthesis, and thus are cytotoxic during the S-phase of the cell cycle. Thus, they have a greater toxic effect on rapidly dividing cells (such as malignant and myeloid cells, and GI & oral mucosa), which replicate their DNA more frequently, and thus inhibits the growth and proliferation of these non-cancerous cells as well as causing the side-effects listed.

Limitations

Side-effects
The antifolate action specifically targets the fast-dividing cells, and tend to have adverse effects on the bone marrow, skin, and hair.  As folate is vital in the first trimester of pregnancy for healthy fetal development, the use of antifolates is strongly contraindicated in pregnancy and carries significant teratogenic risk.

Low doses of methotrexate can deplete folate stores and cause side-effects that are similar to folate deficiency. Both high-folate diets and supplemental folic acid may help reduce the toxic side-effects of low-dose methotrexate without decreasing its effectiveness.
Anyone taking low-dose methotrexate for the health problems listed above should consult with a physician about the need for a folic acid supplement.

Resistance
While the role of folate as a cancer treatment is well established, its long-term effectiveness is diminished by cellular response. In response to decreased tetrahydrofolate (THF), the cell begins to transcribe more DHF reductase, the enzyme that reduces DHF to THF. Because methotrexate is a competitive inhibitor of DHF reductase, increased concentrations of DHF reductase can overcome the drugs inhibition.

Many new drugs are under development to reduce antifolate drug resistance.

Images

Drugs that incidentally antagonize folate
The name antifolate usually refers to drugs whose folate antagonism is intentional. In contrast, there are some other drugs, of several drug classes, that antagonize folate incidentally, as an adverse effect, whether mildly or heavily. This effect is often not noticeable except when it causes a neural tube defect in a fetus carried by a woman taking the medication. Such drugs include some anticonvulsants (valproic acid, carbamazepine, phenobarbital, phenytoin, and primidone) and trimethoprim. Lamotrigine is also an anticonvulsant with known (from in vitro testing) weak anti-folate effects.

See also
 Sulfonamides, a class of antimicrobials that work by inhibiting folate biosynthesis.

References

External links